Guardian Angels Church may refer to:

In the United States
 Guardian Angels Roman Catholic Church, Santee, California, U.S. (near San Diego)
 Holy Guardian Angels Church and Cemetery Historic District, listed on the National Register of Historic Places in Carroll County, Iowa, US
 Guardian Angels Church (Manistee, Michigan), a church on the National Register of Historic Places in Michigan
 Guardian Angels Church (Chaska, Minnesota), a historic church in Minnesota
 Guardian Angel Cathedral, a Roman Catholic cathedral in Las Vegas, Nevada, U.S.
 Church of the Guardian Angel (Manhattan), a historic church in New York City
 Church of the Guardian Angel, in Wallis Texas

In Great Britain
 The Guardian Angels Church, Mile End, a historic church in London